Wilson Grosset (born 15 October 1981) is an association footballer from Réunion. Currently playing for Etoile FC in the Singapore S.League, Grosset has plied his trade in the lower leagues in France, but has also made appearances for clubs in the Scottish Third Division and the Réunion Premier League. He plays as a midfielder.

Career
In 2000, after a successful trial Grosset moved to then Scottish Third Division club Albion Rovers F.C. by then manager John McVeigh from Réunion Premier League club US Stade Tamponnaise. However, his spell was short, only making 6 appearances for the club, scoring once in Albion's 2-0 win over Montrose F.C.

After leaving Scotland, Grosset became somewhat of a Journeyman, playing for 4 clubs in the space of 4 months, before settling down with a 6-year stint with AS Poissy. In late 2006 he moved to FC Villefranche where he made 77 appearances for 17 goals.

He then moved abroad once more, signing a contract with Professional Singapore S.League club Etoile FC, making his debut in the Week 16, 7-2 loss to Albirex Niigata Singapore FC. His first goal for the club however, would come soon thereafter with a tight 1-0 victory over Gombak United in the 2011 Singapore Cup.  He would however go on to score a hat trick for Etoile in a 6-1 thumping over Tanjong Pagar.

References

External links
 

1981 births
Living people
French footballers
Footballers from Réunion
AS Poissy players
FC Martigues players
Albion Rovers F.C. players
FC Villefranche Beaujolais players
RC Épernay Champagne players
Association football midfielders
Étoile FC players